The following is a list of noted principals, alumni and professors of Université de Montréal.

Rectors

Faculty
 Ishfaq Ahmad, visiting professor of theoretical physics (1960–1966; 1996–1999)
 Yoshua Bengio, computer scientist noted for work in artificial neural networks and deep learning
 Stéphane Dion, former professor of political science, leader of the Liberal Party of Canada (2006–2008)
 Jocelyn Faubert, professor in the School of Optometry, Director of the Psychophysics and Visual Perception Laboratory
 David Feuerwerker, former professor of sociology (1966–1968) and founder of the department of Jewish studies
 Pierrette Gaudreau, director of the neuroendocrinology lab at the CHUM and aging specialist.
 E. Mark Gold, Departement d'Informatique (c.1972–1978)
 Lionel Groulx, former professor of history
 Hubert Lacroix, associate professor at the Faculty of Law
 Jean-Daniel Lafond, former professor and former Viceregal consort of Canada
 Georges Larivière, former director the Faculty of Physical education, writer, ice hockey coach 
 Jean-François Lisée, visiting scholar (2001–2002), political advisor and former executive director for the Center for International Studies, now Parti Québécois leader and leader of the Official opposition at the Quebec's National Assembly
Louise Nadeau, professor of psychology
Vardit Ravitsky, professor of bioethics
 Michel Seymour, professor of philosophy
 James R. Taylor, professor emeritus at the department of communication
 Dale C. Thomson, former professor and departmental director, who also served as professor and Vice-Principal of McGill University
Jeannine Vanier, former professor of music

Noted alumni

An Order of Merit is appointed to particularly successful alumni on an annual basis.

Nobel laureates

Roger Guillemin, Nobel Prize laureate (Medicine, 1977)

Academics, scientists and scholars
Ishfaq Ahmad, nuclear physicist and one of the pioneers of Pakistan's atomic bomb project
Katharine Banham, first woman to be awarded Ph.D. from Université de Montréal in psychology
André Barbeau, neurologist
Gilles Brassard, known for his fundamental work in quantum cryptography, quantum teleportation, quantum entanglement distillation, quantum pseudo-telepathy, and the classical simulation of quantum entanglement
Judith R. Cohen, ethnomusicologist, music educator, and performer
Charles Howard Curran, entomologist
Sylvie Cloutier, molecular geneticist
Francine Descarries, sociologist
Jocelyn Faubert,  psychophysicist best known for his work in the fields of visual perception
David Feuerwerker. founder of the department of Jewish studies at Université de Montréal 
Armand Frappier, physician and microbiologist
Dominique Gaspard, American-born Canadian physician and founding member of the Negro Community Centre of Montreal
Jacques Genest, physician and scientist
Alice Girard, first woman dean at this university
Ian Goodfellow, computer scientist noted for developing generative adversarial networks
Jan Grabowski, historian
Mustapha Ishak Boushaki, physician and scientist
Normand Landry, professor of communication at Université TÉLUQ and current Canada Research Chair in Media Education and Human Rights
Corinne Le Quéré, professor of climate change science
André Lussier, pioneer of clinical and scientific rheumatology in Canada
Brenda Milner, British-Canadian neuropsychologist who has contributed extensively to the field of clinical neuropsychology
Gilles Paradis (M.D.), public health and preventive medicine physician at the Institut national de santé publique du Québec, as well as professor in the Department of Epidemiology, Biostatistics, and Occupational Health and Strathcona Chair in Epidemiology at McGill University.
Amélie Quesnel-Vallée (M.Sc. 2000), Associate Professor with joint appointment in the Departments of Sociology and Epidemiology, and Canada Research Chair in Policies and Health Inequalities at McGill University
Suzanna Randall, German astrophysicist and private astronaut candidate
Hubert Reeves, astrophysicist
Benoît Roux,  Amgen Professor of Biochemistry and Molecular Biophysics at the University of Chicago
Camille Sandorfy, quantum chemist
Hans Selye, pioneering Hungarian-Canadian endocrinologist
Daniel Thalmann, pioneer in virtual humans
Rodrigue Tremblay, Canadian economist, humanist and political figure
Carolyn Muessig, medievalist specializing in sermon literature, female education, and hagiography

Business and media
 Philippe de Gaspé Beaubien, CEO of Telemedia
 Louis R. Chênevert, CEO of United Technologies Corporation
 Patrice Désilets, Canadian game designer best known for creating the Assassin's Creed series
 Arnaud Détrans, Head of General Mills Canadian Division
 Lise Fournel, CIO of Air Canada
 Pierre Lassonde, businessman and philanthropist
 Pierre Nadeau (1936–2019), Canadian journalist, television presenter and producer
 Pierre Karl Péladeau, CEO of Quebecor
 Denis Pisonneault, COO of Via Rail Canada
 Calin Rovinescu, CEO of Air Canada
 Arthur Surveyer, founder of engineering and construction conglomerate SNC-Lavalin Group Inc

Law

Louise Arbour, Supreme Court of Canada Justice (1999–2004), UN High Commissioner for Human Rights (2004–2008)
Maurice Archambault, lawyer and judge
Michel Bastarache, Supreme Court of Canada Justice (1997–2008)
Marie Deschamps, Supreme Court of Canada Justice (2002–2012)
Jules Deschênes, Canadian Quebec Superior Court judge
Johanne Gauthier, judge currently serving on the Federal Court of Appeal
Antonio Lamer, Supreme Court of Canada Chief Justice (1990–2000)
Herbert Marx, lawyer, university law professor, politician, and judge

Politics and government

Stéphanie Allard-Gomez, diplomat
Vincent Auclair, MNA for the Vimont riding
Jean-Martin Aussant, MNA for the Nicolet-Yamaska riding
Raymond Bachand, politician and finance minister of the Quebec Liberal Party
Line Beauchamp, politician and member of the Quebec Liberal Party
Denise Beaudoin, politician and member of the Parti Québécois
Ahmed Benbitour, Algerian politician
Josephat T. Benoit, nine-term Mayor of Manchester, New Hampshire
Jean-Jacques Bertrand, Premier of Quebec (1968–1970)
André Boisclair, leader of the Parti Québécois (2005–2007)
Robert Bourassa, Premier of Quebec (1970–1976, 1985–1994)
Jean Carle, civil servant and executive
François-Philippe Champagne, MP for Saint-Maurice—Champlain
Pierre Dalphond, Canadian senator
Maurice Duplessis, Premier of Quebec (1936–1939, 1944–1959)
Pierre Dupuy, diplomat and writer
Jean-Pierre Goyer, Canadian Cabinet minister
Lomer Gouin, Premier of Quebec (1905–1920)
Michaëlle Jean, journalist, Governor General of Canada
Daniel Johnson, Jr., Premier of Quebec (1994)
Daniel Johnson, Sr., Premier of Quebec (1966–1968)
Pierre-Marc Johnson, Premier of Quebec (1985)
Amir Khadir, MNA and spokesperson for Québec solidaire
Bernard Landry, Premier of Quebec (2001–2003)
Camille Laurin, psychiatrist and Quebec politician
Denis Lazure, psychiatrist and Quebec politician
Georges-Émile Lapalme, leader of the Quebec Liberal Party (1950–1958)
Elsie Lefebvre, MNA for the Laurier-Dorion riding
Jacques Parizeau, Premier of Quebec (1994–1996)
Paul Sauvé, Premier of Quebec (1959–1960)
Pierre Eliott Trudeau, Prime Minister of Canada (1968–1979, 1980–1984)

Arts, music and film

Anne-Marie Alonzo, playwright, poet and critic
Hubert Aquin, novelist and filmmaker
Denys Arcand, filmmaker
Ashot Ariyan, composer and pianist 
Angèle Bassolé-Ouédraogo, poet and journalist
Yves Beauchemin, novelist
Gérard Caron, organist and pianist
Françoise de Clossey, pianist and organist
Christiane Duchesne, researcher, educator, illustrator, translator and writer
Gad Elmaleh, French-Moroccan stand-up comedian and actor
Dédé Fortin, singer
Suzanne Jacob, novelist, poet, playwright, singer-songwriter, and critic
Blanche Lamontagne-Beauregard, first published female poet in Quebec
Marquise Lepage, producer, screenwriter, and film and television director
Gaston Miron,  important poet, writer, and editor of Quebec's Quiet Revolution
Esther Valiquette, documentary film director
Jeannine Vanier, composer and organist
Xue Yiwei, Chinese writer resident in Montreal
Yu Jia Zhai, singer and dancer of idol group AKB48 Team SH

Sports
Marc-Antoine Dequoy, NFL player
Fatima El-Faquir, sprinter, first Moroccan to compete in the Olympics
Charles Mayer (1922), journalist, sportsperson and politician
Anne Montminy, competitive diver, lawyer

Others

Mohamed Diriye Abdullahi, linguist and translator
Marguerite Andersen, writer and educator
Maxime Arseneau, radio host
Abderraouf Jdey, alleged terrorist
Grace Kodindo, obstetrician-gynecologist
Joanne Liu, former head of Médecins sans frontières (MSF, or Doctors Without Borders)
Isabelle Mercier, professional poker player
Lucille Teasdale-Corti, surgeon and international humanitarian aid worker

References

Université de Montréal
Montreal, Universite de
Universite de Montreal people